Sensational is the second album by the British R&B-soul singer Michelle Gayle, released in 1997. It includes three singles which reached the UK Top 20: "Do You Know" (UK #6), "Sensational" (UK #14) and the remixed version of "Happy Just to Be with You" (UK #11), which had been released as a single in 1995. The original version of the song appeared on Gayle's self-titled debut album.

Critical reception
AllMusic wrote that "while Gaye is in strong voice throughout the record and the album has an alluring, classy production, the material is generally colorless, relying more on style than substance."

Track listing
"Fly Away"
"Do You Know"
"Sensational"
"Working Overtime"
"Don't Keep Me Waiting"
"No Place Like Home"
"It's a High"
"Yesterday"
"Talk It Over"
"Fakin' It"
"Fly Away (Reprise)"
"Happy Just to Be with You" (Nigel Lowis Remix)

Charts

References

Michelle Gayle albums
1997 albums
Bertelsmann Music Group albums